Morgoth's Ring (1993) is the tenth volume of Christopher Tolkien's 12-volume series The History of Middle-earth in which he analyses the unpublished manuscripts of his father J. R. R. Tolkien.

Book

Overview 

This volume, along with the subsequent The War of the Jewels, provides detailed writings and editorial commentary pertaining to J. R. R. Tolkien's cosmology that eventually would become The Silmarillion. This volume mentions a few characters excluded elsewhere, including Findis and Irimë, the daughters of Finwë.

Title and inscription 

The title of this volume comes from a statement in one of Tolkien's essays: "Just as Sauron concentrated his power in the One Ring, Morgoth dispersed his power into the very matter of Arda, thus the whole of Middle-earth was Morgoth's Ring".

The title page of each volume of The History of Middle-earth displays an inscription in the Fëanorian characters (Tengwar, an alphabet devised by Tolkien for High-elven), written by Christopher Tolkien and describing the contents of the book.  The inscription in Volume X reads: "In this book are given many of the later writings of John Ronald Reuel Tolkien concerning the history of the Elder Days from the Music of the Ainur to the Hiding of Valinor; here much is told of the Sun and Moon; of the immortal Eldar and the death of the Atani; of the beginning of the Orcs and of the evil power of Melkor, the Morgoth, the Black Foe of the World."

Contents 

Morgoth's Ring presents source materials and editorial commentary on the following:

 Later (1951) revisions of The Silmarillion, showing Tolkien's drastic revisiting and rewriting of his legends.
 The Annals of Aman — the history of the world from the entry of the Valar into Arda until the Hiding of Valinor after the revolt and exile of the Noldor. It is written in the form of year-by-year entries of varying lengths, much like real-world annals. Tolkien attributes the work to the Noldorin lore-master and linguist Rúmil of Tirion. According to the second typescript, The Annals of Aman were remembered by the Noldorin Exiles in Middle-earth, who transmitted their knowledge to the Men of Númenor, whence it eventually reached Arnor and Gondor. Tolkien wrote The Annals of Aman after the completion of The Lord of the Rings. There are three extant versions of the text, including a carefully emended manuscript, a typescript and its carbon copy, each featuring different corrections and notes, and a typescript of the earlier sections of the text that deviates from the previous typescript. Christopher Tolkien surmises that the first typescript was composed in 1958. A reworking of the earlier Annals of Valinor (which was the working title of the manuscript; it is published in The Shaping of Middle-earth) and connected closely with the narrative of the incomplete 1937 Quenta Silmarillion, The Annals of Aman moves from a compressed narrative style to a fuller accounting of the events of the chronology. 
 "Laws and Customs among the Eldar" — several essays and legends on the Eldar (Elves), particularly their mating and naming customs, and their conceptions of the fëa (soul) and hröa (body).
 "Athrabeth Finrod ah Andreth" — A discussion between two characters, Finrod Felagund, an Elven king, and Andreth, a mortal woman, about the tragedy of death and immortality, and the ways in which Elves and Men suffer their different sorrows; and about the healing of death by the Resurrection and the Incarnation, which Tolkien here hints at, but later decided not to bring into his legendarium.
 "Tale of Adanel" — the Middle-earth version of the Fall, attached to "Athrabeth".
 "Myths Transformed" — several fragments on Morgoth, Sauron, and the problem of the origin of the Orcs. This section, which proposes inconsistent solutions to the problem, is frequently cited in discussions of Tolkien's legendarium, and represents the author's later-evolved views on some central topics.

Reception 

Reviewing the book for Mythlore, Glen GoodKnight wrote that in it, Christopher Tolkien leads the reader into "new third phase of his father's concept of Middle-earth after the writing of The Lord of the Rings — his recasting and adding to the mythos." In his view, the book is a major "earthquake" bringing "astounding revelations" about Tolkien's development of Middle-earth. One is the "Athrabeth Finrod ah Andreth" (The Debate of
Finrod and Andreth), meant to be the last item in The Silmarillion's appendix, Tolkien's authoritative last word on the subject; it reveals that death was the product of the evil will of Morgoth. GoodKnight comments that the materials in the book could have radically changed The Silmarillion, had Tolkien lived to finish it "to his satisfaction".

See also 

 Aman
 Eru Ilúvatar
 History of Arda

Notes

References 

Middle-earth books
1993 books
10